Klára Dán von Neumann (born Klára Dán; 18 August 1911 – 10 November 1963) was a Hungarian-American self-taught computer scientist, noted as one of the first computer programmers.

Early life 
Klára Dán was born in Budapest, Hungary on August 18, 1911, to Károly Dán and Kamilla Stadler, a wealthy Jewish couple. Her father had previously served in the Austro-Hungarian Army as an officer during World War I, and the family moved to Vienna to escape Béla Kun's Hungarian Soviet Republic. Once the regime was overthrown, the family moved back to Budapest. Her family was wealthy, and often held parties where Dán would meet many different people from various stations in life.

At 14, Dán became a national champion in figure skating. She attended  in Budapest and graduated in 1929.

Work 
After their wedding, Dán and John von Neumann immigrated to the United States, where he held a professorship at Princeton University. In 1943, von Neumann moved to Los Alamos National Laboratory in New Mexico to work on calculations as part of the Manhattan Project. Dán remained at Princeton until 1946, working at the university's Office of Population Research.

After the war, Dán joined von Neumann in New Mexico to program the MANIAC I machine, which could store data, designed by her husband and Julian Bigelow. She then worked on the ENIAC (Electronic Numerical Integrator and Computer) on a project with von Neumann to produce the first successful meteorological forecast on a computer. Dán designed new controls for ENIAC and was one of its primary programmers. She trained a group of people drawn from the Manhattan Project to store programs as binary code.

She taught the meteorologists how to program ENIAC where she managed 100,000 punch cards ensuring there were no data loss. She worked for 32 days on the project, where she saw through and checked the final code.

After her husband's death from cancer in 1957, Dán wrote the preface to his Silliman Lectures. The lectures were published in 1958 and later edited and published by Yale University Press as The Computer and the Brain.

Personal life 
Dán married Ferenc Engel in 1931 and Andor Rapoch in 1936. She met Hungarian mathematician John von Neumann during a trip he made to Budapest prior to the outbreak of World War II. In 1938, von Neumann's first marriage ended in a divorce, and Dán divorced Rapoch to marry him.

Dán married oceanographer and physicist Carl Eckart in 1958 and moved to La Jolla, California. She died in 1963 when she drove from her home in La Jolla to the beach and walked into the surf and drowned. The San Diego coroner's office listed her death as a suicide.

Further reading

References

External links 

"Lost Women of Science" podcast: "A Grasshopper in Very Tall Grass" Season 2

1911 births
1963 deaths
1963 suicides
Mathematicians from Budapest
American women computer scientists
20th-century American women scientists
Hungarian Jews
Suicides by drowning in the United States
American computer scientists
Hungarian women computer scientists
Computer designers
Hungarian emigrants to the United States
20th-century American mathematicians
Jewish American scientists
Manhattan Project people
Princeton University people
Los Alamos National Laboratory personnel
20th-century Hungarian inventors
Hungarian female single skaters
20th-century American inventors
Women inventors
Klara
Jewish women scientists
Suicides in California
20th-century American Jews
Women on the Manhattan Project
Jewish scientists